Midlands West was a constituency of the European Parliament in the United Kingdom which existed from 1979 to 1999, prior to its adoption of proportional representation.  It elected one Member of the European Parliament by the first-past-the-post electoral system.

Boundaries
1979-1984: Dudley East; Dudley West; Halesowen and Stourbridge; Walsall North; Walsall South; Wolverhampton North East; Wolverhampton South East; Wolverhampton South West.

1984-1999: Dudley East; Dudley West; Halesowen and Stourbridge; Warley East; Warley West; Wolverhampton North East; Wolverhampton South East; Wolverhampton South West.

MEPs

Election results

References

External links
 David Boothroyd's United Kingdom Election Results

European Parliament constituencies in England (1979–1999)
Politics of the West Midlands (region)
1979 establishments in England
1999 disestablishments in England
Constituencies established in 1979
Constituencies disestablished in 1999